Buster Mathis (June 11, 1943 – September 6, 1995) was an American boxer.

Career

Mathis had a successful career as an amateur heavyweight boxer. He qualified for a spot in the 1964 Tokyo Olympics, but had to withdraw due to an injury. He was replaced in the tournament by Joe Frazier who went on to win the gold medal.

Mathis turned professional in June 1965 with a second round knockout victory over Bob Maynard. He went on to win his next 22 contests as well and qualified for a shot at the New York State Athletic Commission World Heavyweight Title, which had become vacant after Muhammad Ali was stripped of the title for refusing to be drafted into the United States Army.

The title fight was held on March 4, 1968, in New York's Madison Square Garden against 'Smoking' Joe Frazier, his old rival. Frazier won by 11th-round knockout. 

Buster Mathis continued to fight in the following years, outpointing George Chuvalo, but losing on points to Jerry Quarry - a fight Mathis was favoured to win. Mathis retired after losing to Quarry in 1969, but returned in 1971 to box Muhammad Ali for the NABF belt, losing on points over 12 rounds. Ali was later criticized for not finishing Mathis in the final rounds of the fight.

After Mathis was knocked out in just two rounds in September 1972 by Ron Lyle, he retired for good.

Retirement
A 1980 Sports Illustrated article featured interviews with Mathis and many of Muhammad Ali's other opponents. It reported Mathis worked in the trucking business after he retired from the ring. 

Mathis had various health problems in later years, including two strokes, a heart attack, and kidney failure. He died of heart failure at age 52. His son Buster Mathis Jr. became a professional boxer, and fought Mike Tyson in 1995.

Professional boxing record

|-
|align="center" colspan=8|30 Wins (21 knockouts, 9 decisions), 4 Losses (2 knockouts, 2 decisions)
|-
| align="center" style="border-style: none none solid solid; background: #e3e3e3"|Result
| align="center" style="border-style: none none solid solid; background: #e3e3e3"|Record
| align="center" style="border-style: none none solid solid; background: #e3e3e3"|Opponent
| align="center" style="border-style: none none solid solid; background: #e3e3e3"|Type
| align="center" style="border-style: none none solid solid; background: #e3e3e3"|Round
| align="center" style="border-style: none none solid solid; background: #e3e3e3"|Date
| align="center" style="border-style: none none solid solid; background: #e3e3e3"|Location
| align="center" style="border-style: none none solid solid; background: #e3e3e3"|Notes
|-align=center
|Loss
|30–4
|align=left| Ron Lyle
|KO
|2
|29 Sep 1972
|align=left| Denver Coliseum, Denver, Colorado
|align=left|
|-
|Win
|30–3
|align=left| Humphrey McBride
|TKO
|3
|5 Sep 1972
|align=left| Oklahoma City, Oklahoma
|align=left|
|-
|Loss
|29–3
|align=left| Muhammad Ali
|UD
|12
|17 Nov 1971
|align=left| Astrodome, Houston, Texas
|align=left|
|-
|Loss
|29–2
|align=left| Jerry Quarry
|UD
|12
|24 Mar 1969
|align=left| Madison Square Garden, New York City
|align=left|
|-
|Win
|29–1
|align=left| George Chuvalo
|UD
|12
|3 Feb 1969
|align=left| Madison Square Garden, New York City
|align=left|
|-
|Win
|28–1
|align=left| J.J. Woody
|TKO
|6
|26 Sep 1968
|align=left| Madison Square Garden, New York City
|align=left|
|-
|Win
|27–1
|align=left| Dick Wipperman
|UD
|10
|16 Sep 1968
|align=left| County Stadium, Milwaukee, Wisconsin
|align=left|
|-
|Win
|26–1
|align=left| Amos Lincoln
|SD
|10
|5 Sep 1968
|align=left| Olympic Auditorium, Los Angeles, California
|align=left|
|-
|Win
|25–1
|align=left| J.J. Beattie
|TKO
|7
|25 Jul 1968
|align=left| Met Center, Bloomington, Minnesota
|align=left|
|-
|Win
|24–1
|align=left| M.J. Turnbow
|TKO
|7
|30 Apr 1968
|align=left| Miami Beach Auditorium, Miami Beach, Florida
|align=left|
|-
|Loss
|23–1
|align=left| Joe Frazier
|TKO
|11
|4 Mar 1968
|align=left| Madison Square Garden, New York City
|align=left|
|-
|Win
|23–0
|align=left| Gerry de Bruyn
|KO
|1
|26 Dec 1967
|align=left| Frolundaborg, Gothenburg
|align=left|
|-
|Win
|22–0
|align=left| Roberto Davila
|TKO
|7
|18 Nov 1967
|align=left| Johanneshov, Stockholm
|align=left|
|-
|Win
|21–0
|align=left| Ron Marsh
|TKO
|4
|18 Sep 1967
|align=left| Madison Square Garden, New York City
|align=left|
|-
|Win
|20–0
|align=left| Wayne Heath
|KO
|5
|2 Aug 1967
|align=left| Los Angeles Memorial Sports Arena, Los Angeles, California
|align=left|
|-
|Win
|19–0
|align=left| Sonny S.D. Moore
|TKO
|5
|23 May 1967
|align=left| Saint Louis, Missouri
|align=left|
|-
|Win
|18–0
|align=left| Ed "Baker Boy" Hurley
|KO
|1
|12 May 1967
|align=left| Detroit, Michigan
|align=left|
|-
|Win
|17–0
|align=left| Waban Thomas
|KO
|1
|6 Feb 1967
|align=left| Astrodome, Houston, Texas
|align=left|
|-
|Win
|16–0
|align=left| E.S. Andrews
|KO
|2
|17 Nov 1966
|align=left| Portland Exposition Building, Portland, Maine
|align=left|
|-
|Win
|15–0
|align=left| Johnny Barazza
|KO
|1
|2 Nov 1966
|align=left| Civic Center, Grand Rapids, Michigan
|align=left|
|-
|Win
|14–0
|align=left| Earl Averette
|TKO
|3
|28 Sep 1966
|align=left| Cambria County War Memorial Arena, Johnstown, Pennsylvania
|align=left|
|-
|Win
|13–0
|align=left| Bob Stallings
|SD
|10
|15 Sep 1966
|align=left| Armory, Akron, Ohio
|align=left|
|-
|Win
|12–0
|align=left| Mert Brownfield
|KO
|1
|29 Aug 1966
|align=left| Cobo Arena, Detroit, Michigan
|align=left|
|-
|Win
|11–0
|align=left| Charley E. Chase
|UD
|6
|28 Jul 1966
|align=left| Portland Exposition Building, Portland, Maine
|align=left|
|-
|Win
|10–0
|align=left| Everett Copeland
|KO
|2
|23 Jun 1966
|align=left| Madison Square Garden, New York City
|align=left|
|-
|Win
|9–0
|align=left| Tom Swift
|KO
|1
|16 Jun 1966
|align=left| Portland Exposition Building, Portland, Maine
|align=left|
|-
|Win
|8–0
|align=left| Charley Polite
|PTS
|6
|16 Feb 1966
|align=left| Westchester County Center, White Plains, New York
|align=left|
|-
|Win
|7–0
|align=left| Mike Bruce
|TKO
|5
|19 Jan 1966
|align=left| Westchester County Center, White Plains, New York
|align=left|
|-
|Win
|6–0
|align=left| Chuck Wepner
|TKO
|3
|7 Jan 1966
|align=left| Madison Square Garden, New York City
|align=left|
|-
|Win
|5–0
|align=left| Charlie Lee
|PTS
|6
|15 Dec 1965
|align=left| Westchester County Center, White Plains, New York
|align=left|
|-
|Win
|4–0
|align=left| Bob Stallings
|UD
|6
|23 Sep 1965
|align=left| Grand Rapids, Michigan
|align=left|
|-
|Win
|3–0
|align=left| Bob Maynard
|PTS
|4
|30 Aug 1965
|align=left| Paul Sauve Arena, Montreal, Quebec
|align=left|
|-
|Win
|2–0
|align=left| Johnny Shore
|TKO
|2
|28 Aug 1965
|align=left| Rock Island, Quebec
|align=left|
|-
|Win
|1–0
|align=left| Bob Maynard
|TKO
|2
|28 Jun 1965
|align=left| Paul Sauve Arena, Montreal, Quebec
|align=left|

References

External links

 

1943 births
1995 deaths
Boxers from Mississippi
Heavyweight boxers
Winners of the United States Championship for amateur boxers
People from Sledge, Mississippi
American male boxers